North Eton (also known as Eton North) is a rural locality in the Mackay Region, Queensland, Australia. In the  North Eton had a population of 186 people.

Geography 
The neighbourhood of Victoria is located within North Eton.

The land is very flat, 30 metres above sea level, with a small rise on the western edge of the locality at the foothills of Mount Kinchant (in the neighbouring locality of Kinchant Dam). The north branch of Sandy Creek flows from the north-west to the south-east of the locality and is part of the Plane Creek drainage basin. The land is entirely used for farming, predominantly sugarcane.

History 

The area has been known as both North Eton and Eton North.

Originally known as the Defiance, the North Eton Central Mill commenced crushing sugarcane in 1888. It was the first sugar mill sponsored by the Queensland Government. In 1989, a number of sugar mills in the district merged to Mackay Sugar Limited, resulting in the closure of the North Eton mill.

The North Eton State School opened on 5 August 1895, but has also been known as the Eton North State School. 

In the 2011 census, North Eton had a population of 536 people.

In the  North Eton had a population of 186 people.

Education 
North Eton State School is a government primary (Prep-6) school for boys and girls at Kinchant Dam Road. In 2015, it had an enrolment of 14 students with 2 teachers (1 equivalent full-time) and 5 non-teaching staff (2 equivalent full-time). In 2018, the school had an enrolment of 13 students with 1 teacher and 5 non-teaching staff (2 full-time equivalent).

There is no secondary school in North Eton. The nearest secondary school is Mirani State High School in Mirani to the north-west.

Community groups 
The Eton / Eton North branch of the Queensland Country Women's Association meets at the QCWA Hall at 7 Mill Street, North Eton.

See also
 List of tramways in Queensland

References

Mackay Region
Localities in Queensland